Eagle Hill School is an independently operated, private boarding school serving students in grades 8-12 with attention deficit hyperactivity disorder, dyslexia, and other learning disabilities in Hardwick, Massachusetts, which was founded in 1967. Two other schools with the same name are located in Greenwich and Southport, Connecticut.

History 
In the early 1960s, Dr. James J.A. Cavanaugh, Director of the Department of Pediatrics at St. Elizabeth's Hospital in Brighton, Massachusetts, began to devote his work to children with dyslexia or a specific learning disability. Eagle Hill School in Hardwick is a preparatory college program, which was conceived from Cavanaugh's recognition of the impact of this disability on the growing child and the limited facilities available for remediation.

Joining Dr. Cavanaugh to launch the school were Educational Director Mr. Charles Drake of Brandeis University and Headmaster Mr. Howard Delano, formerly of Fryeburg Academy. Nineteen children were in residence when the school opened its doors on family owned property in September 1967. All of them were housed in the Main House, which now contains the school's administrative offices. By the third year, a dedicated dormitory was constructed and one-hundred children were in residence. In 2009, the boarding enrollment for the school reached approximately 160 students.

Program 
The school enrolls 220 students in grades 8-12, and features exactly 119 faculty members, a student to teacher ratio of 2.5 to 1, and an average classroom size of 6 to 1.

Teacher Induction Training 
Held every summer on the Eagle Hill campus the EHS Institute for Teacher Induction is an induction training program primarily designed for first, second or third year public school teachers or seasoned teachers who are new to an urban district.  Funded mainly by private organizations  the institute was a line budget item in the 2008 Massachusetts state budget.

The STEM Center 
In September 2019, the school opened a STEM center to include Makerspaces for academics in the fields of science, math, technology, and engineering.

The Cultural Center 
In the fall of 2008, EHS opened a $15,000,000 Cultural Center complete with a new dining hall, classrooms, a black box theatre, and a 500-seat theatre.  Professionals perform at the cultural center during the year and the students use it as well.

Greenwich school 
260 students attend Eagle Hill School in Greenwich, Connecticut, who are in grades K-10, and have mild language-processing disabilities. The school consists of 75 teachers, and a student to teacher ratio of approximately 4 to 1. While the Lower School serves elementary school students, the Upper School educates middle and junior high school students.

Founded in 1975, the school is accredited by the Connecticut State Department of Education and Connecticut Association of Independent Schools. They accept students from Fairfield and Westchester counties, as well as from Manhattan in its day program, and children from the tri-state areas of  Connecticut, New York, and New Jersey in its five-day boarding program.

It is also a highly reputable school for students with learning disabilities, and for eight consecutive years, the school has earned a "school of excellence" distinction listing by the National Association of Special Education Teachers.

Southport School
The Southport School, previously known as Eagle Hill Southport School (EHSS), is a co-educational day school in historic Southport village, Connecticut, enrolling children ages 6 to 15. It was founded in 1985 by a group of educators from the Eagle Hill-Greenwich School, including the founding headmaster, Len Tavormina.  EHSS is located in the former Pequot School Building on the same site where Southport's elementary school and community center have stood since 1855. The classic brick building was erected in 1918, replacing an older wooden structure.  Closed as a school in 1972, the historic building was later acquired by the Southport Conservancy as a treasured landmark. The year 1985 saw its rebirth as a school when it was leased to EHSS under the direction of Headmaster Len Tavormina. EHSS holds a 99-year lease on the building.

Extensive renovations throughout the 1990s transformed the building's interior into a model day school environment. Classrooms, tutorial rooms, offices, staff resource center, curriculum center, and spacious common room were all specially adapted to comfortably serve Eagle Hill's unique educational offerings.

Tavormina retired in 2013, making way for EHSS’ second headmaster: Ben Powers, an educator with deep experience in language-based learning differences, like dyslexia, and ADHD and executive functioning differences. Under Powers’ leadership, EHSS has aligned its program with the huge shifts happening in the learning difference community, thanks to burgeoning brain-based research. Since his arrival, EHSS launched an updated middle school program for sixth, seventh, and eighth graders; focused on incorporating assistive technology into the program; integrated a speech and language pathologist into the program; and, instituted an executive function coaching model. In addition, all of the staff is trained and accredited in the Orton-Gillingham approach.

In November 2017, the school changed its name to The Southport School through an all school community event.

References

External links
Eagle Hill School website
Eagle Hill School Greenwich website
Eagle Hill-Southport website

1967 establishments in Massachusetts
Educational institutions established in 1967
Private high schools in Connecticut
Private high schools in Massachusetts
Boarding schools in Massachusetts
Private middle schools in Massachusetts
Schools in Greenwich, Connecticut
Schools in Plymouth County, Massachusetts
Special schools in the United States
Therapeutic boarding schools in the United States